The Canada Foundation for Innovation (CFI; , FCI) is an independent not-for-profit organization that invests in research facilities and equipment in Canada's universities, colleges, research hospitals, and non-profit research institutions.

Creation
The CFI was created by the Government of Canada through the Budget Implementation Act 1997, Bill C-93, to "help build and sustain a research landscape in Canada that will attract and retain the world's top talent, train the next generation of researchers, support private-sector innovation and create high-quality jobs that strengthen Canada's position in today's knowledge economy".

Funding
The infrastructure funded by the CFI includes the equipment, laboratories, databases, specimens, scientific collections, computer hardware and software, communications linkages and buildings necessary to conduct research.

The CFI has established a merit-review process that relies on experts from across Canada and around the world to ensure that only the best projects receive funding. CFI funding is awarded to institutions, not individual researchers, and all funding proposals must support an institution's strategic research plan. Eligible Canadian institutions apply to the CFI through a suite of funds, and all applications are assessed using three broad criteria: quality of the research and its need for infrastructure, contribution to strengthening the capacity for innovation and potential benefits of the research to Canada.

The CFI funds up to 40 percent of a project's research infrastructure costs. This funding is then leveraged to attract the remaining investment from partners in the public, private and non-profit sectors.

Governance
The CFI was established as an independent, non-governmental organization with a Board of Directors, which meets three to four times a year. The Board of Directors reports to Members—a higher governing body similar to a company's shareholders but representing the Canadian public. Members are nominated and appointed for a five-year term. An annual public meeting is held each year.

Criticism
CFI has been criticized for being redundant and part of a "convoluted" federal funding apparatus.

External projects/facilities
 Canadian Light Source Synchrotron
 SNOLAB
 CCGS Amundsen
 Ocean Networks Canada
 Ocean Tracking Network
 Census of Marine Life
 Barcode of Life

See also
 Dr. Albert D. Friesen

References

External links
 

Federal departments and agencies of Canada
Funding bodies of Canada
Technology companies of Canada
Research management
1997 establishments in Canada
Government agencies established in 1997